The juxtaglomerular apparatus (also known as the juxtaglomerular complex) is a structure in the kidney that regulates the function of each nephron, the functional units of the kidney. The juxtaglomerular apparatus is named because it is next to (juxta-) the  glomerulus.

The juxtaglomerular apparatus consists of three types of cells:
 the macula densa, a part of the  distal convoluted tubule of the same nephron
 juxtaglomerular cells, (also known as granular cells) which secrete renin
 extraglomerular mesangial cells

Location
The juxtaglomerular apparatus is part of the kidney nephron, next to the glomerulus. It is found between afferent arteriole and the distal convoluted tubule of the same nephron. This location is critical to its function in regulating renal blood flow and glomerular filtration rate.

Function

Juxtaglomerular cells

Renin is produced by juxtaglomerular cells, also known as granular cells. These cells are similar to epithelium and are located in the tunica media of the afferent arterioles as they enter the glomeruli. The juxtaglomerular cells secrete renin in response to:

Stimulation of the beta-1 adrenergic receptor
Decrease in renal perfusion pressure (detected directly by the juxtaglomerular cells)
Decrease in NaCl concentration at the macula densa, often due to a decrease in glomerular filtration rate

Extraglomerular mesangial cells
Extraglomerular mesangial cells are located in the junction between the afferent and efferent arterioles. These cells have a contractile property similar to vascular smooth muscles and thus play a role in “regulating GFR” by altering the vessel diameter. Renin is also found in these cells.

Macula densa
At the point where the afferent arterioles enter the glomerulus and the efferent arteriole leaves it, the tubule of the nephron touches the arterioles of the glomerulus from which it arose. At this location, in the wall of the distal convoluted tubule, there is a modified region of tubular epithelium called the macula densa. Cells in the macula densa respond to changes in the sodium chloride levels in the distal tubule of the nephron via the tubuloglomerular feedback (TGF) loop.

The macula densa's detection of elevated sodium chloride, which leads to a decrease in GFR, is based on the concept of purinergic signaling. An increase in the salt concentration causes several cell signals (e.g. adenosine release) that leads to constriction of the adjacent afferent arteriole. This decreases the amount of blood coming from the afferent arterioles to the glomerular capillaries, and therefore decreases the amount of fluid that goes from the glomerular capillaries into the Bowman's space (the glomerular filtration rate (GFR)).

When there is a decrease in the sodium concentration, less sodium is reabsorbed in the macular densa cells. The cells increase the production of nitric oxide and Prostaglandins to vasodilate the afferent arterioles and increase renin release.

See Also:
TGF mechanism.

Clinical significance
Excess secretion of renin by the juxtaglomerular cells can lead to excess activity of the renin–angiotensin system, hypertension and an increase in blood volume. This is not responsive to the usual treatment for essential hypertension, namely medications and lifestyle modification.

One cause of this can be increased renin production due to narrowing of the renal artery, or a juxtaglomerular cell tumor that produces renin. These will lead to secondary hyperaldosteronism, which will cause hypertension, high blood sodium, low blood potassium, and metabolic alkalosis.

See also
Kidney
Renal corpuscle
Juxtaglomerular cell tumor
Hyperaldosteronism
Tubuloglomerular feedback
Myogenic mechanism

References

External links
 Electron micrograph
 Diagram

Kidney anatomy